Arthur Madrigalejos Nery (born January 28, 1996) is a Filipino singer and songwriter. He signed a record deal in 2019 with Kean Cipriano's label O/C under Viva Records, and released his debut album Letters Never Sent in the same year. He became well known in 2021 for his hit single "Pagsamo".

Early life and education 
Nery was born and raised in Cagayan de Oro to a musical family. Both of his parents were singers. The first time he performed in public was when he was eight years old, where he sang "Fly Me to the Moon" for a cousin's debut party. Even so, a career in music was never considered by Nery at the time.

He started writing songs seriously in high school, and received some formal training in singing after joining the glee club in college. He attended Xavier University — Ateneo de Cagayan and majored in Psychology. Before going full-time in his music career, he worked as a call center agent and as an online English teacher for Japanese students.

Nery was booked to sing in comedian Wacky Kiray's show in Bukidnon, who later introduced him to Callalily's frontman Kean Cipriano who at the time had just launched his own label, O/C. On the same night, Nery signed with O/C.

Discography

Studio albums

Singles

References

External links 
 
 

Living people
1996 births
Filipino singer-songwriters
Viva Records (Philippines) artists
Filipino contemporary R&B singers